An invitation to tender (ITT, otherwise known as a call for bids or a request for tenders) is a formal, structured procedure for generating competing offers from different potential suppliers or contractors looking to obtain an award of business activity in works, supply, or service contracts, often from companies who have been previously assessed for suitability by means of a supplier questionnaire (SQ) or pre-qualification questionnaire (PQQ).

The term "notice inviting tenders" (NIT) is often used in purchasing in India.

An ITT differs from a request for quotation (RFQ) or a request for proposal (RFP), in which case other reasons (technology used, quality) might cause or allow choice of the second best offer. An RFP is a request for a price from a buyer but the buyer would also expect suggestions and ideas on how the project work should be done. RFPs are thus focused on more than just pricing/cost, they entail a bit of consulting from the contractor or vendor. The closest equivalent to an ITT in the mainstream private sector is an RFP which, since public money is not involved, typically has a less rigid structure.

Typology
Open tenders, open calls for tenders, or advertised tenders are open to all vendors or contractors who can guarantee performance.
Restricted tenders, restricted calls for tenders, or invited tenders are only open to selected pre-qualified vendors or contractors. The tender stage may form part of a two-stage process, the first stage of which (as in the expression-of-interest (EOI) tender call) was itself advertised, resulting in a shortlist of selected suitable vendors.
Sole source tenders, where only one potential supplier is invited to submit a tender.

The reasons for using restricted tenders differ in scope and purpose. Restricted tenders can come about because of:
confidentiality issues (such as in military contracts)
the need for expeditiousness (as in emergency situations)
a need to exclude tenderers who do not have the financial or technical capabilities to fulfill the requirements.

A sole source tender may be used where there is essentially only one suitable supplier of the services or product.

Etymology
Dictionaries explain the etymology as coming from Old French , which means 'to offer'.

Typical template contents
A typical invitation to tender template in any project has the following sections:
Introduction
 Project background
Legal issues: proposed terms and conditions of contract
 Supplier response required
 Timetable for choosing a supplier
 Requirements for tender submission, for example a fully completed but otherwise unamended form of tender must be submitted by the specified deadline.

Locating tender opportunities
Public sector organisations in many countries are legally obliged to release tenders for works and services. In the majority of cases, these are listed on their websites and traditional print media. Electronic procurement and tendering systems or e-procurement are also increasingly prevalent. The European Union states that 235,000 calls for tender are issued annually using its Tenders Electronic Daily (TED) system, including those issued by countries in the European Economic Area and beyond. Public sector organisations in the United Kingdom use this system but from 11pm on 31 December 2020, at the end of the Brexit transition period, a new e-notification service called "Find a Tender" (FTS) began to be used to post and view public sector procurement notices. Relevant new procurement opportunities launched after 11pm on 31 December 2020 must be published on this website.

A number of companies provide subscription alert services which send notifications of relevant tender documents to the subscriber.

An array of private organisations also assist businesses in finding out about these tenders. Cost may vary from a few pounds a week to a few hundred.

Because of the specialised language and sometimes difficult-to-grasp procedures, there are several consulting organizations, who offer companies tender writing training, or undertake bid-writing for them.

ITTs may be distributed to potential bidders through a tender service, allowing businesses to receive and search live tenders from a range of public and private sources. These alerts are most commonly sent daily and can be filtered down by geographical area, or by business sector. Some tendering services divide types of business opportunities very finely in their own way, by CPV (Common Procurement Vocabulary) codes. This enables a business to find ITTs specific to what that business can supply.

An ITT is usually an open invitation for suppliers to respond to a defined need as opposed to a request being sent to selected potential suppliers. The ITT often requests information following on from other information gathered previously from responses to a Request for information (RFI). This will usually not only cover product and service requirements, but will also ask for information about the suitability of the business. A supplier questionnaire or pre-qualification questionnaire may be used to elicit suitability information from suppliers in a consistent manner.

An ITT is usually expected to conform to some legally standardized structure designed to ensure impartiality, and the tender bid winner is entitled to take responsibility of the contract business supply documentations formalities and settle any tender bid engagement charges for official recording.

Pre-qualification questionnaires
Supplier questionnaires or pre-qualification questionnaires (PQQs) ensure that potential suppliers are all asked the same information when assessing their suitability to be invited to tender or to have their tenders evaluated. Some organisations issue a standard pre-qualification questionnaire, for example the UK government has developed standard core PQQ questions which have been revised several times and are "mandated for use" across government, and has also stipulated that PQQs should not be used by central government contracting bodies when procuring goods or services valued less than the threshold values set by European and UK procurement legislation.

Tender box
A tender box is a mailbox used to receive the physical tender or bid documents, or a digital equivalent. When a tender or bid is being called, a tender or bid number is usually issued as a reference number for the tender box. The tender box would be open for interested parties to submit their proposals for the duration of the bid or tender. After the closing date, the tender box is closed and sealed and can only be opened by either the tender or bid evaluation committee or a member of the procurement department with two witnesses. 

Even though the tender box is not implemented in every country around the world, the procedure remains the same. Tenders have a bidding period available to prepare and bid. Research has shown that the length of this period might affect the number of bids and as a result competition among renderers

Double envelope system
In an open bid or tender system, a double envelope system may be used. The double envelope system separates the technical proposal (based on and intended to meet the statement of work) from the financing or cost proposal in the form of two separate and sealed envelopes. During the tender evaluation, the technical proposal would be opened and evaluated first followed by the financing proposal. The objective of this system is to ensure a fair evaluation of the proposal. The technical proposal would be evaluated purely on its technical merits and its ability to meet the requirements set forth in the Invitation without being unduly skewed by the financial proposal.

Security deposit
Registered contractors may be required to furnish a bond for a stipulated sum as security or earnest money deposit to be adjusted against work done, normally in the form of bank guarantee or surety.

Tender validity date
A tender validity date is a date until which a tenderer commits to keeping their prices (and other tender details) open for acceptance (or otherwise) by the client. Such a date is usually included in a form of tender, either as a specified date or as the termination of a specified period from another key tender date. For example, in tendering for gym equipment in 2013, West Dunbartonshire Council required tenderers to accept that "Your tender shall remain open for acceptance for ninety (90) days from the date for return of tenders indicated above, or any subsequent date notified to you by us. Your tender may be accepted by us at any time during this period."

Post-tender negotiation
Post-tender negotiation involves negotiation between an intending buyer and seller after a seller's tender has been submitted. An initial stage may involve tender clarification, which is intended to eliminate any uncertainties or contradictory elements of a proposal, before moving into a true "negotiation" phase.

The Chartered Institute of Procurement & Supply believes that "provided it is undertaken professionally and ethically, ... post tender negotiation is an appropriate process to secure value for money.

Related proposal types 
Other types of proposal and terms in use include:
EOI – expression of interest
IFB – invitation for bids
ITN – Invitation to negotiate
ITV – invitation to vendors
RFA – request for applications
RFD – request for documentation
RFI – request for information
RFO – request for offers
RFP – request for proposal
RFQ – request for quotation or request for qualifications
RFS – request for services
Sources sought

See also
Construction bidding
E-procurement
ERFx
Government procurement
Government procurement in the European Union
Presales
Private electronic market
Procurement
Project management
Proposal (business)
Request for proposal
Reverse auction
Statement of work
Strategic sourcing

References

Procurement
Governmental auctions